The Hildyard Baronetcy, of Patrington in the County of York, was a title in the Baronetage of England. It was created on 25 June 1660 for Robert Hilyard, of Patrington and Winestead. The ancient Hildyard family is thought to have been of Norman origin. Robert Hildyard served as Gentleman of the Bedchamber to King Charles I of England and was a major-general in the King's army during the English Civil War. He took part in the Battle of Marston Moor. He was raised to a baronetcy by Charles II following the Restoration of the Monarchy. He was succeeded by his grandson Sir Robert Hildyard, 2nd Baronet, a Member of Parliament for Hedon. He was succeeded by his nephew, the third Baronet, who was Member of Parliament for Great Bedwyn. The latter's son, the fourth Baronet, was High Sheriff of Yorkshire in 1783. On his death in 1814 the baronetcy became extinct.

History
The Hildyard family was a land owning family from Yorkshire, England. Winestead was among their primary estates. The earliest member of the family was Robert Hildyard of Normanby, who was living in 1109. Sir Robert Hildyard, son of Sir Christopher and Elizabeth (Welby) Hildyard, was created baronet, and was the ancestor of the Hildyard baronets.

Hildyard baronets, of Patrington (1660)
 Sir Robert Hildyard, 1st Baronet (1612–1685)
 Sir Robert Hildyard, 2nd Baronet (1670–1729) (grandson)
 Sir Robert Hildyard, 3rd Baronet (1716–1781) (nephew)
 Sir Robert Hildyard, 4th Baronet (1743–1814) (son)

Extended family
An ancient branch of Hildyard, descending from the first Baronet's elder brother, Henry Hildyard (1610–1674) is extant.

References

Extinct baronetcies in the Baronetage of England